Halolaguna sublaxata is a moth in the family Lecithoceridae. It is found in the provinces of Hubei, Jiangsu, Liaoning, Shanxi and Zhejiang in China, and in Taiwan, Korea and Japan.

The wingspan is 14–15 mm.

References

Moths described in 1978
Halolaguna
Moths of Japan